Blizzard of 1978 may refer to:

 Great Blizzard of 1978, a historic winter storm that struck the Ohio Valley and Great Lakes regions of the United States and Southern Ontario in Canada from Wednesday, January 25 through Friday, January 27, 1978
 Northeastern United States blizzard of 1978, a catastrophic, historic nor'easter that struck New England, New Jersey, and the New York metropolitan area